Nest is a neofolk / ambient band from Riihimäki, Finland, formed in 1999. The band's inspiration comes from the Finnish folklore, as well as from the works of J. R. R. Tolkien and the Grimm Brothers. Kantele, a traditional Finnish musical instrument, is very prominent in the band's music. They contributed a cover of the song "The Gallant Crow" to the Skepticism tribute album "Entering the Levitation".

Biography

Nest was formed in the spring of 1999 by Aslak Tolonen, who had previously composed computer-generated metal music. During the 1990s, Tolonen learned to play kantele, which coincided with gradual loss of heavy elements from his compositions, until he decided to settle on the acoustic and ambient style exclusively, marking the formation of the band. Nest's name was chosen to evoke the feelings of solace, comfort and freedom to experiment. The band's first demo, Fabled Lore, was released on 1 April 2000.

Line-up
Aslak Tolonen – kantele (15-string), ethnic & north drum, synthesizer, vocals
Timo Saxell – bass, add. guitar, vocals

Discography

Studio albums
 Woodsmoke (2003)
 Trail of the Unwary (2007)
 Mietteitä (2015)

Demos / splits
 Fabled Lore (2000)
 The Unseen Passage / Hidden Stream (2001)
 Agalloch/Nest Split 10" (2004)

Compilations
 Within a Decade (2014) - Contains all tracks from Fabled Lore, The Unseen Passage / Hidden Stream, Woodsmoke and Trail of the Unwary as well as some rare versions and covers

Featured On
 Entering the Levitation - a tribute to Skepticism (2007)
 Whom the Moon a Nightsong Sings (2010) (V/A)

References

External links
Official Homepage
Corvus Records
Nest at The Metal Archives
Nest at MySpace
Nest at Bandcamp

Finnish musical groups
Neofolk music groups
Musical groups established in 1999
1999 establishments in Finland